Enchelyurus brunneolus is a species of combtooth blenny found in coral reefs in the eastern central Pacific ocean, around Hawaii.  This species grows to a length of  SL.

References

brunneolus
Fish described in 1903
Taxa named by Oliver Peebles Jenkins